Verongimorpha is the name of a subclass of sea sponges within the phylum Porifera. It was first authenticated and described by Erpenbeck et al. in 2012.

References

 
Taxa described in 2012
Sponge subclasses
Taxa named by John Hooper (marine biologist)
Taxa named by Gert Wörheide
Taxa named by Rob van Soest